The following article presents a summary of the 2009 football (soccer) season in Brazil, which was the 108th season of competitive football in the country.

Campeonato Brasileiro Série A

The Campeonato Brasileiro Série A 2009 started on May 9, 2009, and concluded on December 6, 2009.

Flamengo declared as the Campeonato Brasileiro Série A champions.

Relegation
The four worst placed teams, which are Coritiba, Santo André, Náutico and Sport, were relegated to the following year's second level.

Campeonato Brasileiro Série B

The Campeonato Brasileiro Série B 2009 started on May 8, 2009, and concluded on November 28, 2009.

Vasco da Gama declared as the Campeonato Brasileiro Série B champions.

Promotion
The four best placed teams, which are Vasco da Gama, Guarani, Ceará and Atlético Goianiense, were promoted to the following year's first level.

Relegation
The four worst placed teams, which are Juventude, Fortaleza, Campinense and ABC, were relegated to the following year's third level.

Campeonato Brasileiro Série C

The Campeonato Brasileiro Série C 2009 started on May 24, 2009, and concluded on September 19, 2009. The Campeonato Brasileiro Série C final was played between América-MG and ASA.

América-MG declared as the league champions by aggregate score of 4–1.

Promotion
The four best placed teams, which are América-MG, ASA, Guaratinguetá and Icasa, were promoted to the following year's second level.

Relegation
The four worst placed teams, which are Sampaio Corrêa, Confiança, Mixto and Marcílio Dias, were relegated to the following year's fourth level.

Campeonato Brasileiro Série D

The Campeonato Brasileiro Série D 2009 started on July 5, 2009, and concluded on November 1, 2009. The Campeonato Brasileiro Série D final was played between São Raimundo and Macaé.

São Raimundo declared as the league champions by aggregate score of 4–4.

Promotion
The four best placed teams, which are São Raimundo, Macaé, Alecrim and Chapecoense, were promoted to the following year's third level.

Copa do Brasil

The Copa do Brasil 2009 started on February 18, 2009, and ended on July 1, 2009. The Copa do Brasil final was played between Corinthians and Internacional.

Corinthians declared as the cup champions by aggregate score of 4–2.

State championship champions

Youth competition champions

(1) The Copa Nacional do Espírito Santo Sub-17, between 2008 and 2012, was named Copa Brasil Sub-17. The similar named Copa do Brasil Sub-17 is organized by the Brazilian Football Confederation and it was first played in 2013.

Other competition champions

Brazilian clubs in international competitions

Brazil national team
The following table lists all the games played by the Brazil national football team in official competitions and friendly matches during 2009.

TBD = to be decided

Women's football

Brazil women's national football team
The following table lists all the games played by the Brazil women's national football team in official competitions and friendly matches during 2009.

TBD = to be decided

The Brazil women's national football team competed in the following competitions in 2009:

Copa do Brasil de Futebol Feminino

The Copa do Brasil de Futebol Feminino 2009 started on September 24, 2009, and concluded on December 1, 2009.

Santos declared as the cup champions after beating Botucatu 3–0.

Other domestic competition champions

Brazilian clubs in international competitions

References

 Brazilian competitions at RSSSF
 2009 Brazil national team matches at RSSSF
 2008–2009 Brazil women's national team matches at RSSSF

 
Seasons in Brazilian football
Brazil